John Hubert FitzHenry Grayson (17 June 1871 – 31 May 1936) was an English cricketer active in the early 1890s.  Born in West Derby, Lancashire (now Liverpool), Grayson was a right-handed batsman and right-arm medium pace bowler who made two appearances in first-class cricket.

Educated at Radley College and playing his club cricket for Birkenhead Park, Grayson made his debut in first-class cricket for Liverpool and District against Yorkshire in 1891 at Aigburth. He played a second first-class match for Liverpool and District in 1893 against the touring Australians. He made a highest score of 36 in first-class cricket, which came against Yorkshire.

He died at Eastbourne, Sussex on 31 May 1936. His brother Henry also played first-class cricket.

References

External links
John Grayson at ESPNcricinfo
John Grayson at CricketArchive

1871 births
1936 deaths
People from West Derby
People educated at Radley College
English cricketers
Liverpool and District cricketers